This is a list of The State episodes.

Series overview

Episodes

Season 1 (1994)

Season 2 (1994)

Season 3 (1994-95)

Season 4 (1995)

Special (1995)

External links
The State Episode Guide by David Wain

State, The